The Chang Thailand Senior Masters presented by ISPS was a men's senior (over 50) professional golf tournament on the European Senior Tour, held at the Royal Gems Golf Club, Thanyaburi, north-east of Bangkok, Thailand. It was held just once, in March 2010, and was won by Boonchu Ruangkit who finished 11 strokes ahead of the field. The total prize fund was $400,000 with the winner receiving $60,000.

Winners

References

External links
Coverage on the European Senior Tour's official site

Former European Senior Tour events
Golf tournaments in Thailand